The Kings' Tart or The Twelfth Night Cake is a 1774 genre painting by Jean-Baptiste Greuze, showing the French tart then traditionally baked for Epiphany to celebrate the arrival of the Three Kings. Since 1836 it has been in the Musée Fabre in Montpellier.

References

1774 paintings
Paintings in the collection of the Musée Fabre
Paintings by Jean-Baptiste Greuze
Genre paintings